Theodore Reich (October 14, 1938 – December 25, 2003) was a Canadian-American professor of psychiatry and genetics at the Washington University School of Medicine. Reich is considered one of the founders of modern psychiatric genetics and mostly studied the genetic aspects of mental illness.

He was a founder and president of the International Society of Psychiatric Genetics and received the organisation's Lifetime Achievement Award in 1999.

Reich earned a bachelor’s degree in honors physiology in 1959 and completed a medical degree at McGill in 1963.

References 

People from Montreal
1938 births
2003 deaths
American people of Canadian descent
Canadian geneticists
Canadian psychiatrists
Jewish psychiatrists
McGill University Faculty of Medicine alumni
Psychiatric geneticists
McGill University Faculty of Science alumni
Washington University School of Medicine faculty